"Good Morning Baby" is a song by Dan Wilson and Bic Runga. The song was released as a single in New Zealand in June 1999 and peaked at number 15. The song is featured in the 1999 film American Pie soundtrack.

The song was included on a limited edition 2-disc re-release of Beautiful Collision (2003); and a live version of the song did feature on the album Together in Concert: Live, (2000).

Chart positions

Covers
 In 2004, indie singer-songwriter Skott Freedman covered the song with fellow indie musician Edie Carey. The version appeared on Freedman's album "Judge a Book".

References

1999 singles
Bic Runga songs
Songs written for films
1999 songs
Universal Records singles
Songs written by Bic Runga
Songs written by Dan Wilson (musician)